(born November 1, 2003) is a Japanese child actress from Tokyo. Her agency is Nichi Park Productions, a division of Nippon TV.

Television Dramas
 Hataraki Man (2007, NTV)
 Shōkōjo Seira (2009, TBS)
 Natsu no Koi wa Nijiiro ni Kagayaku (2010, Fuji TV)
 Deka Wanko (2011, NTV, episode 2)
 Namae o Nakushita Megami (2011, Fuji TV)

References

External links

 

2003 births
Living people
Japanese child actresses
People from Tokyo